The 2014–15 Grand Prix of Figure Skating Final was an international figure skating competition in the 2014–15 season, held together with the ISU Junior Grand Prix Final. The competition was held from December 11 to 14, 2014 in Barcelona, Spain — the first time it took place on the Iberian Peninsula.

The combined event was the culmination of two international series — the Grand Prix of Figure Skating and the Junior Grand Prix. Medals were awarded in the disciplines of men's singles, ladies' singles, pair skating, and ice dancing on the senior and junior levels.

Records 

The following new ISU best scores were set during this competition:

Schedule 
(Local time):

Thursday, December 11
 14:00 - Junior: Ladies' short
 15:05 - Junior: Short dance
 16:20 - Junior: Men's short
 17:25 - Junior: Pairs' short
 19:45 - Opening ceremony
 20:45 - Senior: Pairs' short
 21:30 - Senior: Ladies' short

Friday, December 12
 14:30 - Junior: Ladies' free
 15:40 - Junior: Free dance
 17:00 - Junior: Men's free
 18:15 - Junior: Pairs' free
 19:45 - Senior: Short dance
 21:00 - Senior: Men's short

Saturday, December 13
 16:00 - Senior: Pairs' free
 17:25 - Senior: Ladies' free
 19:25 - Senior: Free dance
 20:45 - Senior: Men's free
Awards ceremony

Sunday, December 14
 12:00 - Exhibition

Qualifiers

Senior-level qualifiers

Changes to initial lineup
 Gracie Gold withdrew due to a foot injury. She was replaced by Japan's Rika Hongo.

Junior-level qualifiers

Medalists

Senior

Junior

Medals table

Overall

Senior

Junior

Senior-level results

Men

Ladies

Pairs

Ice dancing

Junior-level results

Men

Ladies

Pairs

Ice dancing

References

External links
 
 2014–15 Grand Prix Final at the International Skating Union
 Entries: Junior Grand Prix Final, Grand Prix Final
 Starting orders and result details

2014 in Spanish sport
2014 in figure skating
Grand Prix of Figure Skating Final
ISU Junior Grand Prix
International figure skating competitions hosted by Spain
2014 in youth sport
2015 in youth sport